Karel Guzmán Abreu (born 7 February 1995) is a Cuban  professional basketball player for U BT Cluj-Napoca of the Liga Națională.

Professional career
In mid-2017, Guzmán joined Ciclista Juninense, a second-tier team in Argentina. In April 2018, he transferred to the first-tier team Ciclista Olímpico where he originally signed for three seasons.

In the 2018–19 Liga Nacional de Básquet season, as a starter, Guzmán played in 23 matches. He finished 6th in the league in total defensive rebounds (130), and second in 2 point field goal percentage with 70.4. In addition, his 298 total points allowed him to finish second best scorer of his team (surpassed by his Panamaian teammate Trevor Gaskins who got 377), he was the leader in total rebounds (152) and got 35 assists and 47 triples in 119 shots.

Personal
Guzmán is left-handed.

Cuban national team
Guzmán has been a member of the Cuban national basketball team.

References

External links
Profile at Eurobasket.com
Proballers profile
Profile at RealGM.com

1995 births
Living people
Basketball players from Havana
Ciclista Juninense basketball players
Ciclista Olímpico players
CS Universitatea Cluj-Napoca (men's basketball) players
Cuban expatriate basketball people in Argentina
Cuban expatriates in Romania
Cuban men's basketball players
Shooting guards